This is a list of island countries by population density across all islands:

See also
 List of archipelagos
 List of archipelagos by number of islands
 List of artificial islands
 List of divided islands
 List of islands
 List of islands by area
 List of islands by population
 List of islands by population density
 List of island countries

External links
Island superlatives

Lists of countries by population density
Countries by Population Density

hu:Szigetországok listája népsűrűség szerint